Immadi Pulikeshi is a 1967 Kannada-language biographical film written by G. V. Iyer and directed by N. C. Rajan. The cast includes Rajkumar, Udayakumar, Jayanthi, Kalpana and Balakrishna. The film had a soundtrack and original score by G. K. Venkatesh and cinematography by B. Dorairaj and Rajaram.

Immadi Pulikeshi is based on the story of the famous Kannada ruler Pulakeshin II of the Chalukya dynasty, who was significantly involved in branching out the dynasty to extend over most parts of the Deccan. The movie was the 100th movie of actor Balakrishna. Music composer G. K. Venkatesh produced the movie under the banner Sri Venkatesh Chitra. Rajkumar plays the title character Immadi Pulikeshi, while Udayakumar plays a hunchback Kubja Vishnuvardhana and K. S. Ashwath plays the role of Harshavardhana.

V. Vijayendra Prasad, father of S. S. Rajamouli and the story writer of Baahubali: The Beginning had revealed that he was inspired by the hero introduction sequence of this movie and hence incorporated a similar sequence in  the movie Baahubali: The Beginning. He had further revealed that the core story line - where one brother is not given the throne because of his disability, leading to animosity between blood relatives - was also partly inspired by this movie.

Cast
 Rajkumar as Immadi Pulikeshi
 Udayakumar as Kubja Vishnuvardhana
 K. S. Ashwath as Harshavardhana
 Balakrishna
 Jayanthi
 Kalpana
 Narasimharaju
 Sudharshan
 M. R. Thilakam
 M. N. Lakshmi Devi
 Arun Kumar
 Shakti Prasad
 Bhanumathi
 Ganapathi Bhat
 B. Jayamma
 Sundar Raj

Soundtrack
The songs and score were composed by G. K. Venkatesh, with lyrics written by G. V. Iyer

References

External links
 

1967 films
History of India on film
Indian epic films
1960s Kannada-language films
Indian biographical films
Indian black-and-white films
Films scored by G. K. Venkatesh
1960s biographical films